Safwan may refer to:

Places
 Safwan, Iraq, a town in southeastern Iraq
 Safwan Hill, highest terrain feature in the region

Institutions
 Safwan SC, a football club based in Safwan, Iraq

People

Given name
Safouane Attaf, Moroccan judoka (born 1984)
Safwan Ahmedmia, British technology reviewer and Internet personality
Safwan Al-Mowallad, Saudi Arabian footballer (born 1983)
Safwan Abdul-Ghani, former Iraqi footballer (born 1983)
Safwan al-Qudsi, Srian politician (1940-2022)
Safwan Hashim, Malaysian footballer (born 1934)
Safwan Hawsawi, Saudi Arabian football player (born 1992)
Safwan Khalil, taekwondo athlete (born 1986)
Ṣafwān ibn Idrīs, Muslim traditionist (1164/6–1202)
Safwan Mbaé, professional footballer (born 1997)
Safwan ibn Muattal, companion of the prophet Muhammad in Islam (d. 638 or 679)
Safwan ibn Umayya, companion of the prophet Muhammad in Islam
Safwan M. Masri, professor
Safwan Thabet, Egyptian businessman

Surname
Alif Safwan, Malaysian footballer
Haris Safwan Kamal, Malaysian footballer
Bishr ibn Safwan al-Kalbi, provincial governor for the Umayyad Caliphate
Handhala ibn Safwan al-Kalbi, Umayyad governor of Egypt
Jahm bin Safwan, Islamic theologian

Military engagements
Battle of Safwan, campaign of Muhammad
Safwan Airfield standoff, standoff between Iraqi and U.S. forces